Maria Grazia Alice Eleonora Kinsky-Mockridge (born 21 April 1958), commonly known as Margie Kinsky, is an Italian actress and cabaret artist who works in Germany.

Biography
Kinsky was born in Rome to Genilde Kinsky (Genilda Kinská) of the former Bohemian Kinsky family and Italian father Filippo Dozzi. Through her mother, who was born in Czechoslovakia in 1925, Kinsky is related to the former Czech Foreign Minister Karel Schwarzenberg. She is also the great-grandniece of Bertha von Suttner. In Rome, she attended Deutsche Schule Rom. After graduating from high school in 1979, she moved to Germany and studied Romance languages at the University of Bonn. In 1983, she married actor and director Bill Mockridge. Together they have six sons, all of whom have dual citizenship (Italian and Canadian).

All of the couple's sons follow their parents' example and work. They include film and television director (Nick Mockridge), entrepreneur and coach (Matthew "Matt" Mockridge, ex-boy band Part Six), comedian (Luke Mockridge), musician (Leonardo "Lenny" Mockridge) and actors Jeremy Mockridge and Liam Mockridge.

References

External links 

 
 Website of Bill Mockridge & Margie Kinsky

1958 births
Living people
Actresses from Rome
Italian cabaret performers
Italian stage actresses
Italian film actresses
Italian television actresses
Italian expatriates in Germany
Italian people of Czech descent
House of Kinsky
20th-century Italian actresses
21st-century Italian actresses